St Ann's Well railway station was a station serving the suburb of St Ann's in Nottingham, Nottinghamshire. It was located on the Great Northern Railway Nottingham Suburban Railway. The station was opened in 1889, only to be closed to regular passenger traffic on 1 July 1916 and completely to through traffic in 1951

See also
Sherwood railway station
Thorneywood railway station
Nottingham's Tunnels

References

Further reading

Marshall, J., (June 1961) "Nottingham Suburban Railway" Railway Magazine article

Disused railway stations in Nottinghamshire
Former Great Northern Railway stations
Railway stations in Great Britain opened in 1889
Railway stations in Great Britain closed in 1916